Money Heist is a Spanish television series created by Álex Pina. The first season, consisting of two parts, premiered on 2 May 2017, on Spanish network Antena 3. The TV show portrays heists on the Royal Mint of Spain and the Bank of Spain by a group of code-named robbers, as their battle with hostages on the inside, and the police on the outside.

In late 2017, Netflix acquired the global streaming rights for the series, and re-cut the original 15 episodes into 22. Netflix officially renewed the series for a third part in 2018, which premiered on 19 July 2019. A fourth part was released on 3 April 2020. A documentary involving the producers and cast premiered on Netflix the same day, titled Money Heist: The Phenomenon. In July 2020, Netflix renewed the show for a fifth and final part, which were released in two five-episode volumes on 3 September and 3 December 2021, respectively. Similar to Money Heist: The Phenomenon, a two-part documentary involving the producers and cast premiered on Netflix the same day, titled Money Heist: From Tokyo to Berlin.

Series overview

Episodes

Part 1 (2017)

Part 2 (2017)

Part 3 (2019)

Part 4 (2020)

Part 5 (2021)

Notes

References 

Lists of crime drama television series episodes
Lists of Spanish television series episodes
Episodes